Wolf Creek School Division No. 72 or Wolf Creek Public Schools is a public school authority within the Canadian province of Alberta operated out of Ponoka.

See also 
List of school authorities in Alberta

References

External links 

 
Ponoka, Alberta
School districts in Alberta